Achinhoan is a settlement on the Kintyre peninsula in Argyll and Bute, Scotland. It consists of a handful of buildings, half a mile (one km) west of Achinhoan Head and three miles (five km) southeast of Campbeltown.

Footnotes

Villages in Kintyre